Miridus quadrivirgatus is a species of plant bug belonging to the family Miridae, subfamily Mirinae.

Description
Red and cream-coloured stripes run down the head, pronotum, and scutellum, and the cuneus is red.

Distribution
It is mainly found in Austria, Belgium, Bulgaria, Canary Islands, Croatia, France, Germany, Greece, Italy, Portugal, Spain, Switzerland, the Netherlands, Ukraine and Britain I. In Britain, it is found between Suffolk and Pembrokeshire.

References

Insects described in 1853
Hemiptera of Europe
Mirinae
Taxa named by Achille Costa